HD 181720 b is an extrasolar planet which orbits the G-type main sequence star HD 181720, located approximately 190 light years away in the constellation Sagittarius. This planet has at least three-eighths the mass of Jupiter and takes over two and five-eighths years to orbit the star at a semimajor axis of 1.78 AU with an eccentricity of 0.26. This planet was detected by HARPS on October 19, 2009, together with 29 other planets.

The planet HD 181720 b is named Toge. The name was selected in the NameExoWorlds campaign by Ghana, during the 100th anniversary of the IAU. Toge means earring in the Ewe language.

See also 
 HD 5388 b
 HD 190984 b

References 

Exoplanets discovered in 2009
Exoplanets detected by radial velocity
Giant planets
Sagittarius (constellation)
Exoplanets with proper names